Theisoa is a genus of moth in the family Gelechiidae.

Species
 Theisoa constrictella (Zeller, 1873)
 Theisoa multifasciella Chambers, 1875
 Theisoa pallidochrella (Chambers, 1873)

References

Anomologini